United States gubernatorial elections were held on 5 November 1957, in two states, New Jersey and Virginia.

Results

References

 
November 1957 events in the United States